The Alcazaba of Antequera is a Moorish fortress in Antequera, Spain. It was erected over Roman ruins in the 14th century to counter the Christian advance from the north.

The fortress is rectangular in shape, with two towers. Its keep (Spanish: Torre del homenaje, 15th century) is considered amongst the largest of al-Andalus, with the exception of the Comares Tower of the Alhambra.
It is surmounted by a Catholic bell tower/chapel (Templete del Papabellotas) added in 1582.

Connected to the former by a line of walls is the Torre Blanca ("white tower").

Terminology

The term alcazaba, used for Moorish fortifications in Portugal and Spain, comes from the Arabic casbah, usually used for similar structures in North Africa.

Notes

External links 

Buildings and structures completed in the 14th century
Antequera
Castles in Andalusia
Buildings and structures in Antequera